Ali Dehbashi is an Iranian journalist, Iranologist, researcher and writer. He is the writer and editor in chief of Bukhara magazine, a periodical magazine on arts and culture in Persian published in Tehran.

Ali Dehbashi is a member of Societas Iranologica Europaea (European Iranian Studies Society), and has attended many meetings in its periodical conferences in different universities and cultural centers all over the world.

Works and publications
 1982 – Travelogue of Mozafaraddin Shah to Europe, edited by Ali Dehbashi, first edition, Ketab-e- Farzan Publications, Tehran
 1983 – Journals of Dr. Ghassem Ghani (First volume: My life), introduction by Ali Dehbashi, first edition, Aban publications, Tehran
 1983 – The Conqueror of the Jungle (Memories by General Major Denstroville), translated by Hossein Ansari, Introduction by Ali Dehbashi, first edition, Farzan Publications, Tehran
 1983 – Assarol-ajam (Persian works) by Mohammad Nassir Hosseini (Forsatodowleh Shirazi), edited by Ali Dehbashi, first edition, Negah Publications, Tehran; Second edition, Beh Did Publications 1999
 1983 – Travelogue of Shirly Brothers, translated by Avaness, edited by Ali Dehbashi, first edition, Negah Publications, Tehran; Second edition, 1999, Beh Did Publications
 1983 – Travelogue of Chardan (Isfahan part), translated by Hossein Arizi, introduction by Ali Dehbashi, first edition, Negah Publications, Tehran 1983
 1984 – Travelogue of Haj Sayyah to Europe, edited by Ali Dehbashi, first edition, Nasher Publications, Tehran; Second edition, Sokhan and Shahb Sagheb publications, 1999; Third edition, Sokhan and Shahb Sagheb Publications, 2000
 1985 – The memorial volume of Jalal Al Ahamd (first volume), edited by Ali dehbashi, first edition, Payk Publications; Second edition, Beh Did Publications, 1999
 1985 – Letters by Jalal Al Ahmad (first volume), edited by Ali Dehbashi, first edition by Payk Publication; Second edition, Bozorgmehr Publications, 1986; Third edition, Beh Did Publications, 1999
 1987 – Letters by Kamalalmolk, edited by Ali Dehbashi, first edition, Bozorgmehr Publications, Tehran; Second edition Beh Negar Publications, Tehran 1989
 1985 – The memorial volume of Kamalalmolk, edited by Darab Behnam Shabahang and Ali Dehbashi, Chekameh Publications, Tehran; Second edition, Beh Did Publications, 2000
 1989 – Book of Beh Negar, edited by Ali Dehbashi, Beh Negar Publications, Tehran
 1989 – Fath-Nameh Nayebi (Nayebi’s Letter of Victory) composed by Montakhabolsadat Yaghmaie, with an introduction by Malekolmovarekhin Sepehr, edited and described by Ali Dehbashi, Esparak Publications, Tehran
 1989 – Toghyane Nayebian Dar Jaryane Enghelab Mashrootiat Iran (Nayebian Revolt During Iranian Revolution for Constitution), by Mohammad Reza Khosravi, edited by Ali Dehbashi, Beh Negar Publications, Tehran
 1989 – Political Memoirs of Iraj Eskandari, edited by Ali Dehbashi, first edition, Elmi Publications, Tehran; Second edition, Elmi Publications, 1989; Third edition, Elmi Publications, 2000
 1990 – Selected Poems by Parvin Etesami, with an introduction by Ali Dehbashi, Ghoghnoos Publications, Tehran 1990
 1991 – The memorial Volume of Parvin Etesami, edited by Ali Dehbashi, first edition, Donyaye Madar Publications, Tehran 1991
 1991 – Ferdowsi and Shahnameh, edited by Ali Dehbashi, first edition, Modaber Publications, Tehran 1991
 1993 – Gol Ranjhaye Kohan (Ancient Endeavors) by Dr.Jalal Khaleghi Motlagh, edited by Ali Dehbashi, first edition, Nashr Markaz Publications, Tehran
 1997 – The memorial volume of Dr. Abdol Hossein Zarrinkoob, edited by Ali Dehbashi, first edition, Cultural Heritage Society and Center of Islamic Large Encyclopedia Publications, Tehran
 1997 – The memorial volume of Abdolhassan Saba, edited by Ali Dehbashi, first edition, Vida Publications, Tehran 
 1998 – Dar Tariki Hezareha (In the Darkness of Thousands) by Iraj Eskandari, edited by Ali Dehbashi, first edition, Ghatre Publications, Tehran
 1998 – The memorial volume of Seyed Mohammad Ali Jamalzadeh, edited by Ali Dehbashi, first edition, Sales Publications, Tehran
 1998 – The Rubaiyat of Omar Khayyam, with an introduction by Ali Dehbashi, first edition, Honar Saraye Gooya Publications, Tehran; Second edition, Honar Saraye Gooya Publications, 2002
 1999 – The memorial volume of Sohrab Shahid Sales, edited by Ali Dehbashi, first edition, Sokhan and Shahab, Tehran 1999
 1999 – The memorial volume of Allame Mohammad Ghazvini, edited by Ali Dehbashi (with an introduction by Dr. Abdol Hossein Zarinkoob), first edition, Ketab va Farhand Publications, Tehran
 1999 – Memories pf Ardeshir Avanessian, edited by Ali Dehbashi, first edition, Sokhan and Shahab Publications, Tehran; second edition Sokhan and Shahab Publications, 2000 
 1999 – Ayeneh Ebrat, memories of Dr. Nassrollah Saifpour Fatemi, edited by Ali Dehbashi, first edition, Sokhan and Shahab Publications, Tehran
 1999 – Selected works of Seyed Mohammad Ali Jamalzadeh, edited by Ali Dehbashi, first edition, Sokhan and Shahab Publications, Tehran
 1999 – As Soft As Rain (The memorial volume of Fereidon Moshiri) edited by Ali Dehbashi, first edition, Sokhan and Shahab Publications, Tehran; Second edition Sokhan and Shahab Publications, Tehran, 2000
 1999 – Memories of Prices Arfa, edited by Ali Dehbashi, first edition, Sokhan and Shahab Publications, Tehran; Second edition Sokhan and Shahab Publications, Tehran 2000
 1999 – Writing Stories by Seyed Mohammad Ali Jamalzadeh edited by Ali Dehbashi, first edition, Sokhan and Shahab Publications, Tehran
 1999 – Memories of Seyed Mohammad Ali Jamalzdeh, edited by Iran Afshar and Ali Dehbashi, first edition, Sokhan and Shahab Publications, Tehran 1999
 2000 – Bitter and Sweet by Seyed Mohammad Ali Jamalzadeh, edited by Ali Dehbashi, first edition, Sokhan Publications, Tehran
 2000 – A Brief Familiarity with Hafez by Seyed Mohammad Ali Jamalzadeh, edited by Ali Dehbashi, first edition, Sokhan Publications, Tehran
 2000 – Once Upon A Time by Seyed Mohammad Ali Jamalzadeh, edited by Ali Dehbashi, first edition, Sokhan Publications, Tehran
 2000 – The End of the Tale by Seyed Mohammad Ali Jamalzadeh, edited by Ali Dehbashi, first edition, Sokhan Publications, Tehran
 2000 – Gholtashan Divan by Seyed Mohammad Ali Jamalzadeh, edited by Ali Dehbashi, first edition, Sokhan Publications, Tehran 
 2005 – The History of Iran-Russia Relations by Seyed Mohammad Ali Jamalzadeh, edited by Ali Dehbashi, third edition, Sokhan Publications, Tehran
 2005 – Jamali Kashkool by Seyed Mohammad Ali Jamalzadeh, edited by Ali Dehbashi, first edition, Sokhan Publications, Tehran
 2005 – Hezar Bishe by Seyed Mohammad Ali Jamalzadeh, edited by Ali Dehbashi, second edition, Sokhan Publications, Tehran
 2005 – Ganje Shaygan Seyed Mohammad Ali Jamalzadeh, edited by Ali Dehbashi, third edition, Sokhan Publications, Tehran
 2000 – Kharnameh (Donkey Book) by Mohammad Hassan Khan Etemadolsaltaneh edited by Ali Dehbashi, first edition, Ketab Panjareh Publications, Tehran; Second edition, Ketab Panjareh Publications Tehran; Third edition, Ketab Panjareh Tehran 2000; Fourth edition, Ketab Panjareh, Tehran
 2000 – Golden Record (The memorial Volume of Dr.Abdol Hossein Zarinkoob) edited by Ali Dehbashi, first edition, Daftar Pazhooheshhaye Farhangi Publications, Tehran
 2000 – Political Diaries of Dr.Fereidoun Keshavarz, edited by Ali Dehbashi, first edition, Nashr Abi Publications, Tehran
 2000 – Interviews (Collection of interviews with cultural, Art and Iranology celebrities), edited by Ali Dehbashi, Sedaye Moasser Publications, Tehran 
 2000 – Asman va Risman by Seyed Mohammad Jamalzadeh, edited by Ali Dehbashi, first edition, Sokhan Publications, Tehran
 2001 – The memorial volume of Sadeh Choobak, edited by Ali Dehbashi, first edition, Saless Publications, Tehran
 2001 – Socio-Political Life of Mozafar Firooz, edited by Ali Dehbashi, first edition, Sokhan and Shahab Publications, Tehran
 2001 – Old and New by Seyed Mohammad Jamalzadeh, edited by Ali Dehbashi, first edition, Sokhan Publications, Tehran
 2001 – Short Tales for Children with Beard by Seyed Mohammad Jamalzadeh, edited by Ali Dehbashi, first edition, Sokhan Publications, Tehran
 2001 – The Old Days (Memories of Dr.Gholam Hossein Foroutan), edited by Ali Dehbashi, first edition, Sokhan Publications, Tehran
 2001 – Seven Countries by Seyed Mohammad Jamalzadeh, edited by Ali Dehbashi, first edition, Sokhan Publications, Tehran
 2001 – The memorial volume of Sadegh Hedayat, edited by Ali Dehbashi, first edition, Saless Publications, Tehran
 2001 – Returning Back (The memorial volume of Dr.Abdol Hossein Zarinkoob) edited by Ali Dehbashi, first edition, Behdad Publications, Tehran
 2001 – The memorial volume of Seyed Abolghassem Enjavi Shirazi, edited by Ali Dehbashi, Sokhan Publications
 2002 – House of Daee Yusef (Memories of Atabak Fatthollazadeh), edited by Ali Dehbashi, Ghatre Publications, first edition
 2001 – On the Same Leaven by Seyed Mohammad Ali Jamalzadeh edited by Ali Dehbashi, first edition, Sokhan Publications, Tehran
 2003 – The Old Discourses by Seyed Mohammad Ali Jamalzadeh edited by Ali Dehbashi, first edition, Afkar Publications, Tehran
 2003 – Talking of Mothers through Works of Poets, edited by Ali Dehbashi, first edition, Bahar Sabz Publications, Tehran
 2003 – Ghanbar Ali by Seyed Mohammad Ali Jamalzadeh edited by Ali Dehbashi, first edition, Sokhan Publications, Tehran
 2003 – The Gifts of the Other World (A Review of the Life and Works of Mowlana) edited by Ali Dehbashi, first edition, Sokhan Publications, Tehran
 2003 – Oral History of Iranian Publishing, edited by Abdol Hossein Azarang and Ali Dehbashi, first edition, Ghoghnoos Publications, Tehran
 2003 – Oral History of Iranian Press, edited by Seyed Farid Ghassemi and Ali Dehbashi, first edition, Ghoghnoos Publications, Tehran
 2003 – A Woman with A Garden of Roses (The Festschrift of Simin Behbahani) edited by Ali Dehbashi, Negah Publications, Tehran
 2004 – Isfahan (A Photo Album of Seven Photographers) text written by Ali Dehbashi, Gooya Publications, Tehran
 2004 – May va Mina (Wine & Enamel, A Review of Life and Works of Omar Khayyam) edited by Ali Dehbashi, Gooya Publications, Tehran
 2004 – On the Shore of the Wandering Island (The Festschrift of Dr.Simin Daneshvar), edited by Ali Dehbashi, Sokhan Publications, Tehran
 2004 – The Memorial of Dr. Mehdi Semsar, edited by Ali Dehbashi, first edition, Ghatre Publications, Tehran
 2004 – Bookshop (In the Memory of Babak Afshar) requested by Iraj Afshar (in collaboration with Abdolhossein Azarang, Ali Dehbashi, Seyed Farid Ghassemi and Nader Motalebi Kashani) Shahab Sagheb Publications, Tehran
 2004 – Research & Criticism of Goli Taraghi’s Works edited by Ali Dehbashi, Mehdi Karimi, first edition, Ghatre Publications, Tehran
 2005 – In the Memory of Bozorg Alavi edited by Ali Dehbashi, first edition, Saless Publications, Tehran
 2005 – Knowing Taghi Modaressi edited by Ali Dehbashi and Mehdi Karimi, first edition, Ghatre Publications
 2007 – Yade Yare Mehraban (In Memory of the Lind Friend), edited by Ali Dehbashi, Sedayeh Moaser, Tehran

References

1958 births
Iranian journalists
Iranian writers
Iranian Iranologists
People from Tehran
Living people
Persian-language writers